Sätra SK is a sports club in Sätra, Sweden, established in October 1967 as Sätrahöjdens SK before changing name some months later. 10 years after establishment, it had become a bandy and soccer-club only, since the early 1980s club's main focus is women's and girls' soccer.

The women's soccer team, which was started in 1969, played three seasons in the Swedish top division between 1978–1980.

References

External links
Sätra SK 

Football clubs in Stockholm County
Association football clubs established in 1967
Bandy clubs established in 1967
Figure skating clubs in Sweden
Swimming clubs
Table tennis clubs in Sweden
Defunct bandy clubs in Sweden
Defunct ice hockey teams in Sweden
1967 establishments in Sweden
Sport in Stockholm